Eduardo González Calleja (born 1962) is a Spanish historian, professor of Contemporary History at the Charles III University of Madrid (UC3M). He is the author of a long list of scholar works dealing with political violence.

Biography 
He was born in Madrid in 1962. In 1989, he earned a PhD in Contemporary History at the Complutense University of Madrid, reading a dissertation titled La radicalización de la derecha durante la Segunda República. 1931-1936. Violencia, paramilitarización y fascistización en la crisis española de los años treinta ("the radicalization of the right during the Second Republic. 1931–1936. Violence, paramilitarization and fascistisation"), supervised by Julio Aróstegui. He became a full researcher at the CSIC's Instituto de Historia. A senior lecturer at the Charles III University of Madrid (UC3M) since 2006, he was appointed to a Chair in Contemporary History in 2017.

Works 

Author
 
 
 
 
 
 
 
 
 
 
 
 
 

Co-author
 
 
 
 

Editor & Coordinator

References 
Citations

Bibliography
 
 
 
 
 
 
 
 
 
 
 
 
 
 
 
 
 
 
 

20th-century Spanish historians
1962 births
Academic staff of the Charles III University of Madrid
Complutense University of Madrid alumni
Academics and writers on far-right extremism
Historians of the Second Spanish Republic
Historians of the dictatorship of Primo de Rivera
Living people
Historians of the Bourbon Restoration in Spain
Historians of carlism
21st-century Spanish historians